EliteXC: Destiny was the inaugural mixed martial arts event by the mixed martial arts organization EliteXC. The event took place on Saturday, February 10, 2007 at the DeSoto Civic Center in Southaven, Mississippi.  The main card aired on Showtime, with the undercard was streamed live on the Proelite.com website.

History
The first EliteXC event ("Destiny") was announced unnamed on November 13th, 2006.  The fight card was finalized with less than one month to go before the debut event. The televised portion of the fight card included the return of MMA veterans Frank Shamrock and Renzo Gracie in the main event.  The show also featured the first female MMA event aired live on television between Gina Carano and Julie Kedzie.

The undercard of EliteXC Destiny was streamed free of charge on Proelite.com and ivtasp.com starting at 7 P.M. EST. Heavy site traffic stopped a number of fans from viewing the fight, but many others were able to successfully view the event. As well, an "online chat" that was displayed under the message board, but numerous users complained in various message boards that their comments were not getting through and that the comments that were getting through were either "plants" or hand-selected to be pro-EliteXC.

The event drew a 1.62 household rating on Showtime.

Results

See also
 Elite Xtreme Combat
 2007 in Elite Xtreme Combat

References

External links
Official EliteXC Site
Official Showtime Networks, Inc. Site
Exclusive EliteXC Interviews and Fighter Bios

Destiny
2007 in mixed martial arts
Mixed martial arts in Mississippi
Sports in Southaven, Mississippi
2007 in sports in Mississippi
Events in Southaven, Mississippi